Brains is a commune in the Loire-Atlantique department in the Pays de la Loire region in western France. The commune is a part of historical Brittany, in the traditional region of Retz, and in the historical region of Nantes.

Geography 

Brains is located between the Loire and Lac de Grand-Lieu, 18 km southwest of Nantes and 4 km northwest of Bouaye. The commune is bordered on the southwest by the river Acheneau. Neighbouring communes are Le Pellerin, Cheix-en-Retz, Port-Saint-Père, Saint-Léger-des-Vignes, Bouaye, Bouguenais, La Montagne and Saint-Jean-de-Boiseau.

According to the classification established by INSEE in 2020, Brains is a rural commune which is a part of the functional urban area of Nantes.

Etymology
The Gaulish root Nemus Brenno (forest of Brenno) is mentioned in a document of the cartulary of Buzay around 1179.

History 
Most of the territory of the commune, covered by a vast forest, belonged during the Ancien Régime to the Dukes of Brittany. Settlements in the area gave birth to a number of lordships with some measure of authority: Jasson, Le Plessis, Le Pesle, Lorière, La Sauvagerie, La Pilaudière and La Guerche. The lordship of Le Pesle, the most important, was originally an appanage of Briord. Today a private residence, it overlooks the Acheneau on the Cour du Pesle.

The château of Le Plessis was the property of Pierre-Suzanne Lucas de La Championnière, lieutenant of François de Charette during the War in the Vendée from 1793-1796.

The château of La Guerche was dependent on Le Pesle until the 17th century. Jules Verne was welcomed there by his uncle Prudent Allotte de la Fuye, owner from 1828 to 1837, during his summer vacations. He wrote some impromptu poetry there.

The church was constructed in 1875 on the site of an older church dating from 1676. The clock tower, with a height of 50 metres, dates from 1901.

The rectory was sold as national property during the Revolution, and is now "l'espace des Clos Mâts", a cultural site with a library and music.

At the end of the 19th century, there were six windmills, of which only those of Charbonnières, Le Breuil, La Fouelle, and La Roche du Gré now survive.

The Napoleonic cadastre denoted a rural territory dotted by villages which are still visible today.

Port Hamoneau, witness to the economic importance of the Acheneau until 1914 for the export of wine and red sand to Nantes, now welcomes hikers and anglers who come to enjoy the peace and quiet of the surrounding marshes, in the shade of the poplar trees.

List of mayors

Transport 
Brains is serviced by the number 88 Semitan bus, linking the town to the terminus (Neustrie) of Line 3 of the Nantes Tramway.

Population

The commune is the 3393rd largest in France (4236th in 1999), and 116th out of the 221 communes in Loire-Atlantique.

The population of the commune is relatively young. The percentage of people older than 60 (11.8%) is less than the national average (22.1%) and the departmental average (20.4%)

Unlike the national and departmental averages, the male population of the commune is higher than the female (50.4%, versus 48.4% nationally and 48.5% departmentally).

The population distribution of the commune by age, in 2008, was:
 50.4% male (0 to 14 years = 27.1%, 15 to 29 years = 14.9%, 30 to 44 years = 24.7%, 45 to 59 years = 21.9%, over 60 years = 113%);
 49.6% female (0 to 14 years = 24.3%, 15 to 29 years = 13.2%, 30 to 44 years = 28.1%, 45 to 59 years = 21.9%, over 60 years = 12.5%).

Personalities
Jules Verne visited Brains many times, at La Guerche, the house of his uncle, and at Le Plessis.

See also
Communes of the Loire-Atlantique department

References

External links 
 Official site of the Mairie de Brains

External links
Official site

Communes of Loire-Atlantique